Lazaro Antonio Díaz Sr. (born March 29, 1963) is an American umpire in Major League Baseball wearing number 63, a reference to his year of birth. He joined the American League's full-time staff in 1999, and has worked throughout both major leagues since 2000. Díaz was promoted to crew chief for the 2022 season, becoming the second full time Latino-born crew chief, after Alfonso Marquez.

His professional umpiring career began after he attended the Harry Wendelstedt Umpire School in 1991. He worked his way up to the International League for the 1995 season. Díaz was one of the 22 umpires promoted to the major leagues in the wake of the Major League Umpires Association's mass-resignation strategy in July 1999. Prior to his professional umpiring career, he served in the Marine Corps Reserves. Díaz was attacked by an intoxicated fan while umpiring first base in a game at Comiskey Park in April 2003. The fan, Eric Dybas, a self-described Cubs fan, had attended a game at Wrigley Field earlier in the day and had been drinking all day. Laz stifled the attack, and the fan was later sentenced to up to 180 days in jail and one month of probation for aggravated battery.

Díaz was the second base umpire when Barry Bonds broke Hank Aaron's career home run record. On July 23, 2009, Díaz was the third base umpire for Mark Buehrle's perfect game.

He has worked the World Series in 2007, 2017 and 2020, the American League Championship Series in 2009, 2015, 2016, and 2021, the Division Series in 2002, 2006, 2007, 2013, 2014, 2017 and 2020 and the Wild Card in 2020, 2021 and 2022. He also umpired the All-Star Game in 2000 and 2010.

Díaz is featured in Pepsi commercials with the Detroit Tigers' Johnny Damon, the Minnesota Twins' Joe Mauer and broadcaster Gary Thorne.

On March 7, 2010, Díaz was inducted to the Cuban Hall of Fame.

During a game on May 30, 2012, Díaz got into an unusual argument with New York Yankees catcher Russell Martin. According to Martin, Díaz punished the catcher for disputing the strike zone by not letting him throw new baseballs out to the pitcher (a preference of Martin's) and claiming that this ability had to be "earned". MLB Executive VP for Baseball Operations Joe Torre spoke to Díaz and Martin about the incident, but Martin said he did not expect any disciplinary action for either man.

MLB selected Diaz to officiate its 2014 Opening Series at the Sydney Cricket Ground in Sydney, Australia from March 20–23, 2014.

See also 

List of Major League Baseball umpires

References

External links
Major league profile
Retrosheet

1963 births
African-American sports officials
American sportspeople of Cuban descent
Living people
Major League Baseball umpires
Sportspeople from Miami
21st-century African-American people
20th-century African-American sportspeople